Barbaro is a surname. Notable people with the surname include:

 Antonio Barbaro (died 1679), Venetian naval commander
 Carmelo Barbaro (born 1948), member of the Barbaro 'ndrina
 Daniele Barbaro (1514-1570), Patriarch of Aquileia
 Ermolao Barbaro (born 1410), bishop of Treviso and Verona
 Ermolao Barbaro (1454-1493), Patriarch of Aquileia
 Federico Barbaro (1913-1996), Italian missionary in Japan
 Francesco Barbaro (1390-1454), 15th-century Venetian politician
 Francesco Barbaro (1927-2018), American head of the Barbaro 'ndrina
 Francesco Barbaro (Patriarch of Aquileia)
 Giosafat Barbaro, fifteenth century author and explorer
 Gary Barbaro (born 1954), former National Football League player
 Giuseppe Barbaro (born 1956), Italian Mafia boss
 Jacopo Barbaro, alternate spelling of Jacopo de' Barbari's surname
 Joe Barbaro, a character in the video game Mafia II
 Lou Barbaro (1916-1976), professional golfer
 Marcantonio Barbaro, 16th-century Venetian politician
 Marco Barbaro, 16th-century genealogist
 Michael Barbaro (born 1979), American journalist
 Monica Barbaro (born 1990), American actress
 Umberto Barbaro (1902-1959), Italian film director and screenwriter

Italian-language surnames